Nicolaides–Baraitser syndrome (NCBRS) is a rare genetic condition caused by de novo missense mutations in the SMARCA2 gene and has only been reported in fewer than 200 cases worldwide. NCBRS is a distinct condition and well recognizable once the symptoms have been identified.

The differential includes Coffin–Siris syndrome.

Symptoms

The most common symptoms of Nicolaides–Baraitser syndrome are mild to severe developmental delays with absent or limited speech, seizures, short stature, sparse hair, typical facial characteristics, brachydactyly, and prominent finger joints and broad distal phalanges.

Major Features of NCBRS

 Mild prenatal growth retardation
 Moderate postnatal growth retardation
 Mild to severe developmental delay
 Severely impaired speech
 Seizures
Microcephaly
 Sparse hair
 Progressive skin wrinkling
 Thick, anteverted alae nasi
 Long and broad philtrum
 Large mouth
 Thin upper and thick lower vermilion
 Progressive prominence of distal phalanges
 Progressive prominence of inter-phalangeal joints
 Scoliosis
 Short metacarpals–metatarsals

Cause
This condition occurs via mutations in the SMARCA2 gene.  In rare instances this condition can occur via a mutation in the ARID1B gene.

History 

Paola Nicolaides was a pediatric neurologist and Michael Baraitser a clinical geneticist, both working in Great Ormond Street Hospital for Children in London. They saw a young girl with an unusual combination of signs and symptoms, and thought this to be a recognizable entity. They published this in a medical journal in 1993. Other authors later suggested to name the entity after the authors who had first described it.

References

External links 

 Nicolaides Baraitser Syndrome (NCBRS) Website  
 Nicolaides Baraitser Syndrome Website (Spanish)
 Facebook Support Group

Syndromes